Natella (Georgian: Нателла) is a Georgian feminine given name that may refer to
Natella Akaba (born 1945), Abkhazian historian and politician
Natella Boltyanskaya (born 1965), Russian journalist, singer-songwriter, poet and radio host 
Natella Krapivina (born 1982), Ukrainian film producer
Natella Krasnikova (born 1953), Russian field hockey player

 Georgian feminine given names